AAC Kulturanova (Association for Alternative Creation) is a non-government, non-profit organization founded in May 2001 in Novi Sad, Serbia) as an umbrella organization for various non-formal independent art groups, individuals and young artists from Novi Sad. 

Kulturanova organization focuses its development on urban youth culture and raising awareness on relevant social issues, with the vision of building creative platforms for youth of Novi Sad and region.

References

Cultural organizations based in Serbia
Arts organizations established in 2001
2001 establishments in Serbia